Josef Vosolsobě (3 January 1905 – 4 April 1986) was a Czech athlete. He competed in the men's long jump at the 1936 Summer Olympics.

After World War II, he worked as a sport journalist at ČTK.

References

1905 births
1986 deaths
Athletes (track and field) at the 1936 Summer Olympics
Czech male long jumpers
Olympic athletes of Czechoslovakia
People from Jindřichův Hradec
Czech sports journalists